Cecil L. Thomas (born October 21, 1952) is an American politician and former law enforcement officer who served as a member of the Ohio Senate from the 9th district.

Early life and education 
Thomas was born in rural northern Alabama and moved to Cincinnati, Ohio at a young age. He graduated from Withrow High School. In 1974, Thomas earned a Bachelor of Science degree in law enforcement technology from the University of Cincinnati. He later earned another Bachelor of Science degree, in criminal justice management, from the Union Institute & University.

Career 
After high school, he joined the Cincinnati police cadet program, and served the city of Cincinnati as a police officer for the next 27 years. In 2005, following his retirement from the police force, Thomas ran and won election to Cincinnati City Council, where he served for the next eight years.

In 2014, Thomas declared his candidacy for the Ohio Senate. Incumbent Eric Kearney was term-limited and could not run for another term. He was one of numerous Democrats to vie for the nomination, including Dale Mallory, who many saw as a frontrunner. He won the primary, and go on to face Charlie Winburn, another viable opponent, however this time Republican. However, Thomas defeated Winburn 56%-44%. Cecil was a candidate for the 2021 Cincinnati mayoral election, placing third in a field of six candidates.

References

External links
Campaign site
Campaign Facebook page

1952 births
Living people
Democratic Party Ohio state senators
21st-century American politicians
Ohio city council members
African-American state legislators in Ohio
Candidates in the 2021 United States elections
21st-century African-American politicians
20th-century African-American people